,  is a third-class airport located in Yonaguni, Yaeyama District, Okinawa Prefecture, Japan.

History

The airport opened in 1943 for military use, and became a civilian airport in 1957. International service started in 2007 with a charter flight to/from Taipei operated by Uni Air, with another flight to Hualien, Taiwan operated by TransAsia Airways the following year.

Airlines and destinations

Passenger

References

External links
 Yonaguni Airport
 Yonaguni Airport Guide from Japan Airlines
 

Airports in Okinawa